Admiral Alan Lee Beaumont,  (24 December 1934 – 21 September 2004) was a senior officer in the Royal Australian Navy, whose career culminated with his appointment as Chief of the Defence Force from 1993 to 1995.

Early life
Alan Lee Beaumont was born on 24 December 1934 in Newcastle, New South Wales. He was educated at Boolaroo Public School and Newcastle Technical High School.

Military career
Beaumont joined the Royal Australian Naval College in 1948, graduating in 1951.

He trained with the Royal Navy and Royal Australian Navy before being promoted to lieutenant in 1956. He completed a Torpedo Anti-Submarine specialist course with the Royal Navy between 1959 and 1960, and later served periods of exchange service with the Royal Navy and United States Navy as a specialist in the field.

As a lieutenant commander, Beaumont served as Executive Officer on  during a seven-month Vietnam War tour in 1969. He was promoted to commander for his service in this position, and posted as Officer-in-Charge HMAS Watson.

Staff postings in Canberra followed, including Director of Underwater Weapons, Follow-on Destroyer Project Officer, Director of Naval Plans, Director General Naval Plans and Policy and President of Officers Selection Boards. For his service as Director of Naval Plans, Beaumont was appointed a Member of the Order of Australia (AM) in the Australia Day Honours list of 1982.

Beaumont was appointed Chief of Staff to the Flag Officer Naval Support Command in January 1987, later being promoted to rear admiral in June and assuming the duties of Assistant Chief of Naval Staff (Development). He was appointed to the post of Assistant Chief of the Defence Force (Personnel) on 5 December 1988, and appointed an Officer of the Order of Australia (AO) in the 1989 Queen's Birthday Honours list.

Promoted to vice admiral on 11 September 1989, Beaumont assumed the appointment of Vice Chief of the Defence Force, serving in this position until October 1992. For his distinguished command in this position, Beaumont was appointed a Companion of the Order of Australia (AC) in the Australia Day Honours List of 1992, becoming the first person to receive three awards of the Order of Australia.

Beaumont was promoted to admiral on 17 April 1993 and commenced his appointment as Chief of the Defence Force (CDF). Beaumont retired from the Royal Australian Navy on 6 July 1995, and was succeeded as CDF by General John Baker.

Later life
Between 2000 and 2003, Beaumont served as President of the Multiple Sclerosis Society of the ACT.

He died on 21 September 2004, after a long battle with cancer. He is survived by his second wife, Justine, and four children from a previous marriage to Noreen, who had widowed him.

Honours and awards

References

External links
Air Force Newspaper – Funeral for former CDF
The Multiple Sclerosis Society of the ACT – Announcement of Beaumont's death
Official photo

1934 births
2004 deaths
Military personnel from New South Wales
Australian military personnel of the Vietnam War
Companions of the Order of Australia
Graduates of the Royal Australian Naval College
People from New South Wales
Royal Australian Navy admirals
Recipients of the Centenary Medal
Chiefs of the Defence Force (Australia)
Vice Chiefs of the Defence Force (Australia)